Llandaff and Barry was a county constituency centred on the towns of Llandaff and Barry in Wales.  It returned one Member of Parliament to the House of Commons of the Parliament of the United Kingdom.

The constituency was created for the 1918 general election, and abolished for the 1950 general election.

Boundaries 
The Urban District of Barry, and the Rural District of Llandaff and Dinas Powis.

Members of Parliament

Elections

Elections in the 1910s

Elections in the 1920s

Elections in the 1930s 

General Election 1939–40

Another General Election was required to take place before the end of 1940. The political parties had been making preparations for an election to take place and by the Autumn of 1939, the following candidates had been selected; 
Conservative: Patrick Munro
Labour: Lynn Ungoed-Thomas

Elections in the 1940s

References 

Barry, Vale of Glamorgan
Historic parliamentary constituencies in South Wales
Llandaff
Politics of Glamorgan
Constituencies of the Parliament of the United Kingdom established in 1918
Constituencies of the Parliament of the United Kingdom disestablished in 1950
Politics of Cardiff